Bazyli Bohdanowicz (1740–1817) was a Polish violinist and composer.

1740 births
1817 deaths
Polish composers
Polish violinists
Male violinists